Here Comes My Man is an EP by The Gaslight Anthem. The EP has performances of three original songs and one cover version. It was released on November 28, 2012, only in the UK.

Composition
The EP is a reworked version of the Hold You Up EP released a few days earlier in the US, as part of Record Store Day. It has the album version of "Here Comes My Man" from the band's 2012 album, Handwritten. The order of the remaining songs is slightly altered from the Hold You Up release.

Track list

References

The Gaslight Anthem albums
2012 EPs
2012 live albums